Seasons Change is the fourth studio album by American country music singer Scotty McCreery. It was released on March 16, 2018, as his first album for Triple Tigers, and his first since See You Tonight five years prior. The album's lead single is "Five More Minutes", which gained in radio popularity at a point when McCreery was not signed to a label. The song's success led to him signing with Triple Tigers, and in early 2018, "Five More Minutes" became McCreery's first No. 1 Country Airplay single. "This Is It" and "In Between" were released as the album's second and third singles, respectively.

Content
Prior to the album's release, McCreery was signed to Mercury Nashville, and was dropped after "Southern Belle", the intended lead single to a third Mercury album, failed to reach Top 40 on the country music charts. McCreery released the song "Five More Minutes" in 2016, when he was not signed to a record label. Due to the song gaining airplay on Bobby Bones' radio show, "Five More Minutes" gained in popularity and led to McCreery signing with Triple Tigers. In early 2018, "Five More Minutes" became McCreery's first No 1 hit on the Billboard Country Airplay charts. "This Is It" was released as the album's second single in May 2018, and became his second No. 1 hit on the Country Airplay chart. "In Between" was released as the album's third single on April 1, 2019.

Aaron Eshuis, Derek Wells, and Frank Rogers produced the album, and McCreery co-wrote every song on it.

Critical reception
Rating it 4 out of 5 stars, Stephen Thomas Erlewine of AllMusic thought that it was McCreery's "best album yet". He also praised the influences of 1990s country music, and thought that the album showed a maturity over the singer's Mercury albums. Sounds Like Nashville writer Cillea Houghton reviewed the album with favor, stating that it "isn’t a stark difference from his past projects, and it doesn’t have to be, acting more like an extension of what made fans love him in the first place."

Commercial performance
Seasons Change debuted at number seven on the US Billboard 200 with 40,000 album-equivalent units, of which 34,000 were pure album sales. It is McCreery's fourth US top 10 album. The album has sold 97,800 copies in the US as of August 2019.

Track listing

Personnel
Credits adapted from AllMusic.

Vocals
Wes Hightower – background vocals 
Scotty McCreery – lead vocals 
Russell Terrell – background vocals

Musicians

J. T. Corenflos – electric guitar
Eric Darken – percussion
David Dorn – Hammond B-3 organ, piano, synthesizer, Wurlitzer
Aaron Eshuis – acoustic guitar, electric guitar, Hammond B-3 organ, synthesizer
Shannon Forrest – drums, percussion 
Steve Hermann – trumpet
John Hinchey – trombone
Jim Horn – saxophone
Mike Johnson – steel guitar
Gordon Mote – piano
Justin Schipper – steel guitar
Jimmie Lee Sloas – bass guitar
Ilya Toshinsky – banjo, bouzouki, acoustic guitar, mandolin
Derek Wells – acoustic guitar, electric guitar, mandolin

Production

Austin Atwood – engineering assistance
Richard Burrow – engineering
Drew Bollman – engineering assistance
Sara Dodds – art direction, design
Shauna Dodds – art direction, design
Aaron Eshuis – engineering, production, programming 
Scott Johnson – production assistance
Andrew Mendelson – mastering
Justin Niebank – engineering, mixing
Jeff Ray – photography
Frank Rogers – production, programming
Lance Van Dyke – engineering assistance
Derek Wells – production
Brian David Willis – digital editing

Charts

Weekly charts

Year-end charts

Singles

Certifications

References

2018 albums
Albums produced by Frank Rogers (record producer)
Scotty McCreery albums
Thirty Tigers albums